The Lola T90/00 is a highly successful open-wheel racing car chassis, designed and built by Lola Cars that competed in the CART open-wheel racing series, for competition in the 1990 season. It was extremely competitive, winning a total of 12 races that season, including a win for Dutchman Arie Luyendyk at the prestigious Indianapolis 500. It also gave American Al Unser Jr. his first of two IndyCar World Championships, with Galles-Kraco Racing. It was powered by the  Ilmor-Chevrolet 265-A turbo engine.

References 

Open wheel racing cars
American Championship racing cars
Lola racing cars